Aristidis Rapanakis (11 February 1954 – 22 October 2022) was a Greek competitive sailor and Olympic medalist. He won a bronze medal in the Soling class at the 1980 Summer Olympics in Moscow. His death was announced on 23 October 2022.

References

External links

1954 births
2022 deaths
Greek male sailors (sport)
Olympic sailors of Greece
Olympic bronze medalists for Greece
Olympic medalists in sailing
Sailors at the 1980 Summer Olympics – Soling
Medalists at the 1980 Summer Olympics